This is a list of fiction set in Berlin, Germany. 
¨
Of all European cities, Americans today are perhaps most curious about Berlin, whose position in the American imagination is an essential component of nineteenth-century, postwar and contemporary transatlantic imagology.¨

List
(Clicking on the small triangles at the head of a category will sort the list according to this category.)

References

Related lists 

 List of films set in Berlin

External links
Berlin in Fiction

 
Fiction